Marcinkowo  is a village in the administrative district of Gmina Purda, within Olsztyn County, Warmian-Masurian Voivodeship, in northern Poland. It is located within historic Warmia.

There are two historic Warmian wayside shrines in Marcinkowo, and a train station and a school.

References

Marcinkowo